Nikolay Mogilevsky (born 1926) is a Soviet former sports shooter. He competed in the trap event at the 1956 Summer Olympics.

References

External links
 

1926 births
Possibly living people
Soviet male sport shooters
Olympic shooters of the Soviet Union
Shooters at the 1956 Summer Olympics
Place of birth missing (living people)
Date of birth missing (living people)